Albert Baldwin Bantock (1862–8 February 1938), served as Mayor of Wolverhampton for three terms.

Early life
Born in Wolverhampton in 1862, his father was Thomas Bantock, also a mayor of Wolverhampton, and he was educated at Tettenhall College before joining the family firm of Thomas Bantock & Co., coal and iron agents. Bantock was brought up in the family home, Merridale House, now Bantock House, and lived there for the rest of his life, spending time and money improving it.

Politics

Bantock was a Liberal supporter and was elected to the town council in 1900. He was chairman of the finance committee and served as Mayor of Wolverhampton in 1905/06, 1906/07 and again in 1914/15. Bantock is credited with bringing several improvements to the town including the West Front gardens at St Peter's and changes to Queen Square.

Bantock was both a borough and a county magistrate, and in 1920 he was appointed High Sheriff of Staffordshire.

Personal life
He was a member of the Congregational Church becoming Senior Deacon; served as a board member at several hospitals and was a generous benefactor. In 1926 he received the Freedom of the Borough.

He died in 1938. In his will he left the house and land to his wife on the understanding that on her death it would pass to the people of the town. The Corporation now run it as Bantock House Museum and Park.

References

1862 births
1938 deaths
Mayors of Wolverhampton
Aldermen of Wolverhampton
People from Wolverhampton
People educated at Tettenhall College
English people of Scottish descent
People of the Victorian era
High Sheriffs of Staffordshire